Of Lucifer And Lightning is the fourth and final full-length album from blackened death metal band Angelcorpse.  It was released in 2007 on Osmose Productions.

Track listing
All songs written By Helmkamp/Palubicki.

"Credo Decimatus" — 1:28
"Antichrist Vanguard" — 3:28
"Machinery of the Cleansing" — 3:30
"Hexensabbat" — 4:44
"Extermination Sworn" — 3:51
"Saints of Blasphemy" —  6:04
"Thrall" — 4:20
"Shining One (Rex Luciferi)" — 5:09
"Lustmord" — 3:52

Personnel
Pete Helmkamp – bass, vocals
Gene Palubicki – lead and rhythm guitars
John Longstreth – drums

Production
Engineers: Greg Marchak, Brett Portzer

References

2007 albums
Angelcorpse albums
Osmose Productions albums
Albums with cover art by Jean-Pascal Fournier